The Residential Palace Darmstadt (German: Residenzschloss Darmstadt, often also called Stadtschloss) is the former residence and administrative seat of the landgraves of Hesse and from 1806 to 1919 of the Grand Dukes of Hesse-Darmstadt. It is located in the centre of the city of Darmstadt. The palace consists of an older Renaissance part and an 18th century Baroque part.

, the castle is the seat of the Technische Universität Darmstadt and the German-Polish Institute.

History

Middle Ages 
The origins of the castle lie in the Katzenelnbogen time. In the middle of the 13th century the counts of Katzenelnbogen built a moated castle in Darmstadt. In 1330 Darmstadt received town rights, one year later the castle is mentioned for the first time in a document. From 1386, the moated castle loses importance and becomes a widow's residence and secondary residence. In the following two centuries, the counts of Katzenelnbogen extended and rebuilt the castle again and again. Until the middle of the 15th century the castle was transformed into a representative castle and Darmstadt became Katzenelnbogen's second residence. What remains of the moated castle are the form of the central church courtyard and the outer walls of the manor house. When the last count von Katzenelnbogen died in 1479, Darmstadt fell to Henry III, Landgrave of Upper Hesse. When Philip I took over the government offices in 1518, the castle was destroyed for the first time in an attack by Franz von Sickingen. The castle was rebuilt in the following years, but with essentially the same defensive structures. During the Schmalkaldic War in 1546 it was destroyed again by imperial troops.

Renaissance era 

Landgrave George I considerably extended the castle from 1567 to a Renaissance complex and secured it with moats and bastions. The half-timbered floors of the former palace and the hall are rebuilt from stone. The buildings received new roofs. Christoph Müller and Jakob Wustmann developed the old moated castle into a residential palace. After 1589 the office, the stables and the arsenal were built, which no longer exist today. From 1594, the landgrave had orphans educated in the castle. From 1595 to 1597 the Kaisersaal (Emperor's room) and the church were built. The tympanum corridor, which connects the manor with the church, was also built.

The Wallhäuschen, a gate building in the north of the castle, was built in 1627 by Jakob Müller. The bell building was built from 1663 to 1671 according to plans by the architect Johann Wilhelm Pfannmüller. The bells were delivered by Piter Hemony. Darmstadt was attacked by the French in 1693 and the castle burns down.

Baroque era 

Landgrave Ernst Ludwig commissioned the French architect Louis Remy de la Fosse to plan a new baroque palace with four large wings in 1715, after the palace's chancellery had burned down. This was to completely replace the old palace. Due to lack of money, however, only two wings were completed by 1726. These were to remain the last major structural changes to the castle. When Hessen-Darmstadt joined the Confederation of the Rhine in 1806, the castle became the seat of the Grand Dukes of Darmstadt. At the beginning of the 19th century, the upper floors of the new castle were furnished and fitted with window glazing. In 1842, the university and state library and the grand ducal collection with natural history cabinet moved in. Since the 18th century the castle has been less and less inhabited by the grand dukes. More and more institutes were admitted and some of the rooms were reserved for state guests.

20th century 
In 1893, under Ernst Ludwig, Grand Duke of Hesse and by Rhine, structural measures were again being taken. Thus the extension with a tea pavilion was built on the Herrenbau. In 1924, the castle museum moved into the old area of the castle.

After the World War I, the castle passed into the possession of the People's State of Hesse. On the night of the fire in Darmstadt from 11 to 12 September 1944, the castle burned down to the outer walls. Reconstruction began in 1946 and was not completed until the early 1970s. An overall repair was carried out in 2008, which is planned to last for a longer period of time. The bell construction was completed in 2016. The outer appearance was almost completely restored.

Construction 

The castle is divided into three areas: the outer fortification including , the Renaissance castle and the Baroque castle (De-la-Fosse-Bau).

The north is occupied by a park that belongs to the old fortification. In its place was once the deep moat that completely surrounded the castle.

The centerpiece of the Residential Palace Darmstadt is the old Renaissance palace. It still has the almost triangular shape of the old core castle and consists of the castle wings Herrenbau, Weißer Saalbau, Kaisersaalbau, Kirchenbau and the church courtyard. In the southeast is the bell building.

The Baroque part of the castle (De-la-Fosse-Bau or ) consists of a three-storey southern and west wing on an angular floor plan. From the town, a fortified gate leads directly through the baroque castle into the southern courtyard.

Buildings
 Wallhaus (wall building)
 Brückenhaus (bridge building)
 Herrenbau, German-Polish Institute (manor)
 Weißer Saalbau, Schlosskeller, Department of History and Social Sciences (white hall)
 Kaisersaalbau (emperor's hall)
 Kirchenbau, Orgelsaal, Schlossmuseum (church building, organ hall, palace museum)
 Glockenbau with Glockenspiel, Schlossmuseum (bell building with carillon, palace museum)
 Prinz-Christian-Bau (Prince Christian building)
 De-la-Fosse-Bau, Library Department of History and Social Sciences, Executive Board of TU Darmstadt (Baroque castle)

Courtyards
 Kirchenhof (church yard)
 Glockenhof (bell yard)
 Parforcehof

Corridors
 Paukergang

Bridges
 Wallbrücke (wall bridge, north entrance)
 Marktbrücke (south main entrance)
 Parforce-Brücke (west entrance)

Outer fortifications
  (castle moat)

Source:

Location
The castle is located in the centre of Darmstadt. The Hessisches Landesmuseum Darmstadt by Alfred Messel, the neoclassical former court theatre  (House of History) by Georg Moller, the square   are situated in the North. The square  and street  are located in the West.

Gallery

Schlossmuseum
The palace museum shows objects belonging to the former landgraves and Grand Dukes of Hesse-Darmstadt. Opened in 1924, the museum is located in the bell and church building of the residential palace.

Schlosskeller
The  is an event location and a club in the basement of the castle. Since 1966, the club has been run by students.

Music festival Schlossgrabenfest 
The musical spectrum ranges from rock, pop, electro, reggae and hip-hop to soul and jazz.

Royal Ghost Story 
According to several witnesses, including Frederica of Mecklenburg-Strelitz, Duchess of Cumberland and later Queen of Hanover, the ghost of the old Duchess of Darmstadt was seen in one of the rooms of the palace.

See also 
 List of castles in Hesse

References

Further reading 
 
 
 
 
 
 
 
 

Renaissance architecture in Germany
Baroque architecture in Hesse
Baroque palaces in Germany
Residential buildings completed in 1726
Technische Universität Darmstadt
Buildings and structures in Darmstadt
Royal residences in Hesse
Castles in Hesse
Palaces in Hesse
Buildings and structures in Germany destroyed during World War II